Vision is the first EP by Swedish melodic punk rock band No Fun at All, released on 7 July 1993. The EP's style is more hardcore than its follow-up No Straight Angles and other releases.

Originally, Vision was meant to be a 'hope-we-can-sell-all-of-them' release with an initial pressing of a thousand copies. The EP has since gone on to sell over 25,000 copies.

Track listing
All music & lyrics by Micke Danielsson except when noted otherwise.
"Where's the Truth?"  – 2:11
"Vision"  – 1:55
"It's All Up to You"  – 2:00
"I Won't Believe in You"  – 2:05
"Funny?"  – 1:38
"Suffer Inside"  – 2:07
"Sidewalk"  – 2:09
"I Won't Come Back"  – 1:42
"What You Say"  – 1:19

A slow rock rendition of the last track, "What You Say", appears as a hidden track on No Straight Angles.

Personnel
Jimmy 'Jimpa' Olsson - vocals, drums
Mikael 'Micke' Danielsson - guitar, backing vocals
Henrik 'Henka' Sunvisson - bass, backing vocals

References 

1993 debut EPs
No Fun at All albums
Burning Heart Records EPs